James Hodges Ellis (born James Hughes Bell, February 26, 1945 – December 12, 1998), who used the stage name Orion at times in his career, was an American singer. His voice was similar to Elvis Presley's, a fact which he and his record company played upon, making some believe that some of his recordings were by Presley, or even that Presley had not died in 1977. Ellis appeared with many artists, including Loretta Lynn, Jerry Lee Lewis, Tammy Wynette, Ricky Skaggs, Lee Greenwood, Gary Morris, and the Oak Ridge Boys.

Early life
Ellis was born in either Pascagoula, Mississippi, Orrville, Alabama, or Washington, D.C., United States, into a single parent home. His birth certificate states the mother was a secretary named Gladys Bell, and the father was Vernon (no surname). Aged two, he moved with his mother to Birmingham, Alabama, where he was put up for adoption and, aged four, was adopted by R. F. and Mary Faye (nee Hodges) Ellis. He attended Orrville High School, where he excelled in baseball, football and basketball. After winning a state fair competition, his first professional performance was in a Demon's Den nightclub in Albany, Georgia. Ellis entered Middle Georgia College on an athletic scholarship, then transferred to Livingston State University.

Music career
At the start of his music career, Ellis sang in nightclubs and, in 1964, released a single, "Don’t Count Your Chickens Before They Hatch," for a small Georgia label, Dradco. His vocals closely resembled those of Elvis Presley, and in 1969 Shelby Singleton, who had acquired the rights to Sun Records' back catalog, other than Presley's recordings for the label, released a single of Ellis' recordings of Presley's early songs, "That's All Right (Mama)" and "Blue Moon of Kentucky". The label credited the recordings simply to "?", and it was rumored that they were alternate takes from Presley sessions (despite featuring an electric rather than string bass).

After Presley died in 1977, Singleton revived the hoax by releasing singles that overdubbed Ellis' voice onto known Sun recordings by Jerry Lee Lewis, Carl Perkins and others, including a version of "Save the Last Dance For Me,"  on which there was simply a credit to "Friend". The records were endorsed as genuine Presley recordings by the song's co-writer Doc Pomus, the music journalist Roy Carr, and the TV show Good Morning America which undertook a voice comparison test of the song against Presley's voice.  Around the same time, Ellis released another single under his name, "I'm Not Trying To Be Like Elvis", and an album, By Request — Ellis Sings Elvis.

In 1978, writer Gail Brewer-Giorgio published a novel, Orion, about a leading popular singer – based on Presley – who faked his death. Singleton then persuaded Ellis to start appearing as "Orion", wearing a small mask with dyed hair and in similar clothing to that worn by Presley. His album Reborn, showing the singer emerging from a coffin, was released on gold-colored vinyl on the Sun label in 1978. Some listeners believed that Orion was, in fact, Presley, who had supposedly faked his death. Orion had several hits on the country music chart, including "Am I That Easy to Forget" (1980), "Rockabilly Rebel" (1981), and "Crazy Little Thing Called Love" (1981). He also recorded several albums for Sun between 1979 and 1981 and built up a substantial live following, still wearing his mask.

Singleton tore off his mask at a performance in 1983, saying he would not wear it again. However, after failing to retain his popularity using his real name, he returned to performing as Orion in 1987. He also started to run a store in Selma, Alabama, with his girlfriend Elaine Thompson.

Death
On December 12, 1998, Ellis was murdered during a robbery in his store, Jimmy's Pawn Shop. Jeffrey Lee was convicted of the murder of Ellis and Ellis's ex-wife Elaine Thompson, who was working as an employee at the store, and the attempted murder of employee Helen King. The jury recommended Lee be sentenced to life without parole, but the judge sentenced Lee to death. Lee's appeal against the sentence was refused by the Alabama Court of Criminal Appeals on October 9, 2009, and a writ of certiorari was denied by the Supreme Court of the United States in April 2018.

Orion: The Man Who Would Be King
In 2015, film-maker Jeanie Finlay released a documentary film, after pitching it at Sheffield Doc/Fest's 2013 MeetMarket, about Ellis' life and career, Orion: The Man Who Would Be King. The film won the Discovery Award at the British Independent Film Awards 2015. It was released theatrically in the US by Sundance Selects on December 4, 2015.

Orion charted singles

References

External links
Official website
Orion: The Man Who Would Be King documentary website
Ellis's gravesite information on Find A Grave

1945 births
1998 deaths
People from Dallas County, Alabama
Singer-songwriters from Mississippi
American adoptees
American country singer-songwriters
American gospel singers
American male singer-songwriters
American rock singers
American rockabilly musicians
Sun Records artists
American murder victims
Masked musicians
20th-century American singers
Country musicians from Alabama
Country musicians from Mississippi
20th-century American male singers
1998 murders in the United States
People murdered in Alabama
Singer-songwriters from Alabama